The Wonderful World of Jonathan Winters is a 1960 comedy album, performed by Jonathan Winters.

The Wonderful World of Jonathan Winters was also the name of a television special in 1970.

With an unprecedented frenetic energy, Winters made obscure references to his mental illness and hospitalization during his stand-up comedy routines, most famously during the "flying saucer" bit. Winters casually mentions that if he wasn't careful, the authorities might put him back in the "zoo", referring to the institution.

Track listing
Introduction - Flying Saucer
Western
Football Game
Airline Pilots
Used Pet Shop
Hip Robin Hood
Super Service Station
Marine Corps

Personnel
 Jonathan Winters

1960 debut albums
Comedy
1960s comedy albums
1960s spoken word albums
Verve Records albums
Jonathan Winters albums